General elections were held in Greenland on 6 June 1984. Siumut and Atassut both won 11 seats in the 25-seat Parliament. The elections were held part-way through the negotiations of Greenland's exit from the European Economic Community.

Results

References

Elections in Greenland
Greenland
1984 in Greenland